This is a list of events from British radio in 1948.

Events

January
3 January – Sports Report, the world's longest-running sports radio programme, debuts on the BBC Light Programme.
5 January – The first episode of Mrs Dale's Diary, the first significant British radio serial drama, is broadcast on the Light Programme.

February
No events.

March
23 March – Radio comedy Take It from Here, written by Frank Muir and Denis Norden and starring Jimmy Edwards, is first broadcast on the Light Programme; this first series is set in a fictitious commercial radio station office.

April
21 April – Ralph Vaughan Williams' Symphony No. 6 is premiered by the BBC Symphony Orchestra conducted by Sir Adrian Boult at the Royal Albert Hall in London and broadcast on the Home Service.

May to September
No events.

October
12 October – Topical debate programme Any Questions? is first broadcast on the West of England Home Service chaired by Freddie Grisewood; originally intended to run for six fortnightly editions only, it will still be on the air weekly more than sixty years later.

November
No events.

December
26 December – The first series of the BBC's annual Reith Lectures, Bertrand Russell on Authority and the Individual, begins broadcasting on the  Home Service.
28 December – For the second series of Take It from Here, writers Muir and Norden begin to adopt its familiar three-part sketch show format.

Undated
Steuart Wilson becomes head of music at the BBC and Harman Grisewood replaces George Barnes as controller of the BBC Third Programme.

Debuts
3 January – Sports Report (BBC Light Programme, 1948–Present)
5 January – Mrs Dale's Diary (BBC Light Programme, 1948–1969)
23 March – Take It from Here (BBC Light Programme, 1948–1960)
1 May – Top of the Form (BBC Light Programme, 1948–1986)
12 October – Any Questions? (BBC Home Service, 1948–Present)
The McCooeys (1948–1955)

Continuing radio programmes

1930s
 In Town Tonight (1933–1960)

1940s
 Music While You Work (1940–1967)
 Sunday Half Hour (1940–2018)
 Desert Island Discs (1942–Present)
 Family Favourites (1945–1980)
 Down Your Way (1946–1992)
 Have A Go (1946–1967)
 Housewives' Choice (1946–1967)
 Letter from America (1946–2004)
 Woman's Hour (1946–Present)
 Twenty Questions (1947–1976)

Births
8 March – Gyles Brandreth, writer, broadcaster and politician
14 April – Rob Cowan, classical music presenter
29 May – Michael Berkeley, composer and classical music broadcaster
9 June – Nick Clarke, news presenter (died 2006)
18 June – Philip Jackson, actor
25 August – Harriett Gilbert, radio arts presenter
30 August – Robin Lustig, radio news presenter
22 December – Noel Edmonds, broadcast presenter and producer
Paul Lewis, financial broadcaster

See also 
 1948 in British music
 1948 in British television
 1948 in the United Kingdom
 List of British films of 1948

References 

 
Years in British radio
Radio